Timothy Paul Bale (born November 1965) is professor of politics at Queen Mary, University of London. He was previously a Professor of Politics at the University of Sussex.

His main research interests are in the fields of British, European and Comparative politics, especially in relation to centre-right and conservative politics.

He was the founding convenor of the Political Studies Association specialist group on Conservatives and Conservatism, which brings together leading scholars with an academic interest in this area.

From September 2019 to December 2020, Tim was deputy director of UK in a Changing Europe.

Selected publications
The Conservative Party: From Thatcher to Cameron
Five Year Mission: The Labour Party Under Ed Miliband

References

External links
Guardian online profile
PSA Conservatives and Conservatism Specialist Group
Queen Mary University of London profile

Academics of the University of Sussex
British political scientists
Living people
Academics of Queen Mary University of London
1965 births
Alumni of Gonville and Caius College, Cambridge
Northwestern University alumni
Alumni of Sheffield Hallam University